Knockdown Center is a cultural space, performance venue, and art center, located in the Maspeth neighborhood of Queens, New York City. The Center includes has many architecturally notable features: 20,000 square-foot main hall, a backyard nicknamed The Ruins, a large gallery, and several other adjacent halls of varying sizes.

Since 2013, Knockdown Center has been the venue of many musical and visual art events. As of 2022, artists who have performed there include LCD Soundsystem, Yung Lean, and Chelsea Manning. Earlier in the same year, Pitchfork announced an all-new concert series called Pitchfork Presents, to be hosted at the Center. The venue has been called the "Queens' answer to The Kitchen," a reference to the notable avant-garde performance venue in Manhattan's Chelsea district.

History 

The building has been in continuous use for 100 years. First constructed in 1903, it was first used as a glass factory by the Gleason-Tiebout Glass Company. In the 1930s, the proprietor of the building transitioned the warehouse for a door manufacturing company. Named the Manhattan Door Factory, this company invented the "knock-down frame," a kind of door which allows contractors to build walls first and then install doors later.

The warehouse became vacant in 2010, when the door company moved its operations to New Jersey. In the years that followed until 2013, the grandson of the original proprietor who inherited the grounds began cleaning the building up.

A few events began in 2013 before the building was renovated. The building’s first liquor license application was denied in April, 2014 prior to an M.I.A. concert on May 9, 2014. 

The renovated first floor opened on May 20, 2016 with liquor license after a very contentious two year struggle.

References 

Buildings and structures completed in 1903
Buildings and structures in New York City
Culture of Queens, New York
Entertainment venues in New York City
Maspeth, Queens